Taoranqiao station is a station under construction on Line 14 of the Beijing Subway. It is planned to open in 2024.

History 
The station was supposed to open in 2015, along with the rest of Line 14 extension. Due to a delay with construction, the station could not be opened with the rest of the stations, so trains do not stop. It is planned to open in 2024.

Station Layout 
This station will have an island platform.

References 

Railway stations under construction in China
Beijing Subway stations in Dongcheng District